WKXQ (92.5 FM) is a radio station licensed to Rushville, Illinois, United States. The station airs an adult standards format, and is owned by LB Sports Productions LLC.

References

External links
WKXQ's website

KXQ
Adult standards radio stations in the United States